Denial of medical care or refusal of medical care may refer to:
Failure to provide medical treatment: the refusal to provide healthcare to a patient who requires it
Refusal of medical assistance: a patient's voluntary refusal to receive medical care